The discography of Japanese pop girl group Flower consists of three studio albums, one compilation album, 18 singles, and 21 music videos.

Studio albums

Compilation albums

Singles

Promotional singles

Other charted songs

Other appearances

Music videos

Notes

References 

Discographies of Japanese artists
Pop music discographies